Armand Di Caro (22 July 1931 – 31 July 1993) was a French racing cyclist. He rode in the 1955 Tour de France.

References

1931 births
1993 deaths
French male cyclists
Place of birth missing